Sara Câmpean (born 16 July 2003) is a Romanian footballer who plays as a goalkeeper for Olimpia Cluj and the Romania women's national team.

Career
She made her debut for the Romania national team on 4 April 2019 against Malta, playing the entire match in a 2–0 win for Romania.

References

2003 births
Living people
Women's association football goalkeepers
Romanian women's footballers
Romania women's international footballers
FCU Olimpia Cluj players